Jeremy Loteteka Bokila (born 14 November 1988) is a Congolese professional footballer who plays as a forward for Eerste Divisie club Willem II. He formerly played for the DR Congo national team.

Club career
Bokila was born in Kinshasa, DR Congo. In the summer of 2012, Bokila was loaned to Liga I team, Petrolul Ploiești, with an option to make the move permanent. In the first half of the season he netted six goals in the league and three in the cup for the Yellow Wolves. In March 2013, it was announced that after continuous outstanding performances, Petrolul Ploiești would make his move permanent in the summer.

In the 2012–13 Liga I season he played in 31 games and scored 16 goals, helping his team finish third in Liga I. In the same season he won the Romanian Cup with Petrolul Ploiești scoring the only goal in the final against CFR Cluj. He played a total of five games and scored six goals in the Romanian Cup in the 2012–13 season.

On 28 August 2013, Bokila joined Russian Premier League side Terek Grozny for a €2.5 million transfer fee from Petrolul who had acquired his services on loan from Zulte.

In July 2015, Bokila signed for Chinese Super League side Guangzhou R&F. For the second half of the 2015–16 season, this club loaned him to the Turkish Süper Lig club Eskişehirspor. After relegation in 2016, he returned, but was immediately loaned to Al-Kharitiyath in Qatar for one season.

In January 2017, Bokila moved to the Turkish Süper Lig club Akhisarspor. He became a part of the team that achieved the most successes in the club's history by winning the 2018 Turkish Super Cup and participating in the 2018–19 Turkish Cup final. After relegation in summer 2019, Bokila was signed by second-tier TFF First League club Hatayspor. In January 2020, he moved to Ankara Keçiörengücü. In October 2020, he signed with Thes Sport in the Belgian National Division 1. He was not yet eligible to play the game on 17 October against Mandel United and then the competition was postponed due to the COVID-19 pandemic.

On 21 January 2021, it was announced that Bokila had signed a contract with USL Championship club Oakland Roots.

Bokila joined Willem II on 6 July 2022, signing a one-year contract with the recently relegated Eerste Divisie club.

International career
Bokila has Congolese and Dutch citizenship but chose to represent the Democratic Republic of the Congo at senior level. Bokila made his national team debut against Burkina Faso on 14 November 2012.

At the 2015 Africa Cup of Nations, Bokila scored an equalising goal in a 1–1 draw with Tunisia to ensure that DR Congo qualified for the knockout stage. In the quarter-finals, he also levelled the scores in a 4–2 win against Congo in which DR Congo came back from 2–0 down.

Personal life
Bokila was born in a footballing family. His father Ndingi Bokila Mandjombolo was known in the eighties as "the pearl of Harelbeke", being a valuable player and top scorer three times in a row at Belgian club K.R.C. Harelbeke, between 1980 and 1982.

His sister Esther and brothers Noé and Wim are also footballers, while Jeremy's older brother Paldy played for TOP Oss among other teams before giving up professional football and emigrating to Italy. His sister Aurelia is not a footballer. Neither is his mother Marie Veronique.

Career statistics

Club

International goals
As of match played 25 May 2016. DR Congo score listed first, score column indicates score after each Bokila goal.

Honours

Club
Sparta Rotterdam
 Eerste Divisie runner-up: 2011–12

Petrolul Ploiești
 Cupa României: 2012–13

CFR Cluj
 Liga I: 2017–18

Akhisarspor
 Turkish Super Cup: 2018

National
DR Congo
 Africa Cup of Nations bronze:2015

References

External links
 

1988 births
Living people
Footballers from Kinshasa
Democratic Republic of the Congo emigrants to the Netherlands
People with acquired Dutch citizenship
Association football forwards
Democratic Republic of the Congo footballers
Democratic Republic of the Congo international footballers
Dutch footballers
AGOVV Apeldoorn players
S.V. Zulte Waregem players
Sparta Rotterdam players
FC Petrolul Ploiești players
FC Akhmat Grozny players
Guangzhou City F.C. players
Eskişehirspor footballers
Al Kharaitiyat SC players
Akhisarspor footballers
Hatayspor footballers
Ankara Keçiörengücü S.K. footballers
K.V.V. Thes Sport Tessenderlo players
CFR Cluj players
FC Dinamo București players
Oakland Roots SC players
Willem II (football club) players
Eerste Divisie players
Belgian Pro League players
Liga I players
Russian Premier League players
Chinese Super League players
Süper Lig players
TFF First League players
Qatar Stars League players
Democratic Republic of the Congo expatriate footballers
Democratic Republic of the Congo expatriate sportspeople in Belgium
Democratic Republic of the Congo expatriate sportspeople in Romania
Democratic Republic of the Congo expatriate sportspeople in Russia
Democratic Republic of the Congo expatriate sportspeople in Turkey
Democratic Republic of the Congo expatriate sportspeople in the United States
Expatriate footballers in Belgium
Expatriate footballers in Romania
Expatriate footballers in Russia
Expatriate footballers in China
Expatriate footballers in Turkey
Expatriate footballers in Qatar
Expatriate soccer players in the United States
2015 Africa Cup of Nations players
2017 Africa Cup of Nations players
Democratic Republic of the Congo expatriate sportspeople in the Netherlands
21st-century Democratic Republic of the Congo people